The Missouri Sports Hall of Fame is located in Springfield, Missouri, United States. Founded in 1994 by Springfield businessman John Q. Hammons, the Hall of Fame is housed in a two-story, 32,000-square-foot building. On display are more than 4,000 items of sports memorabilia and exhibits related to Missouri amateur and professional athletics.  Various interactive attractions allow visitors to simulate driving a NASCAR race car, stepping into the batters box against a Major League Baseball pitcher, and throwing football passes. Next to the Hall is the Legends Walk of Fame, a plaza-like outdoor setting featuring busts and statuary of notable Missouri sports figures given the yearly Legends Award.

Criteria for inclusion
The Missouri Sports Hall of Fame considers for induction individuals and teams that were born in Missouri, made their sports career in Missouri, or contributed to amateur or professional sports in Missouri.

Nominees are presented to a selection board who choose one group a year. The size of the annual groups has increased over the years; today, a series of regional events is held around the state rather than having all new inductees travel to Springfield.

Inductees

See also
University of Missouri Intercollegiate Athletics Hall of Fame
California Sports Hall of Fame#History
St. Louis Wrestling Hall of Fame

References

External links
Missouri Sports Hall of Fame

Halls of fame in Missouri
Missouri
All-sports halls of fame
Sports museums in Missouri

Museums in Springfield, Missouri
Culture of Springfield, Missouri